Teater Vestland (former Sogn og Fjordane Teater) is a theatre based in Førde, Norway, Founded in 1977, it serves as the regional theatre for Vestland, and tours with performances across the county.
Theater tours in Vestland focus especially on new Norwegian drama, plays with stories from the region and politically engaging performances.
In 2010, the theatre and theater director Terje Lyngstad received the Hedda Award (Heddaprisen) in the class "Special artistic effort" for investment in new, Norwegian drama with a regional perspective.

References

Theatres in Norway
Culture in Vestland
1977 establishments in Norway
Tourist attractions in Vestland